was a town located in Awa District, Chiba Prefecture, Japan.

As of October 1, 2004, the town had an estimated population of 6,027 and a density of 353 persons per km². The total area was 17.07 km².

Geography
Shirahama was located at very southern end of Chiba Prefecture, at the southern extremity of Bōsō Peninsula, facing the Pacific Ocean. The town had a temperate maritime climate with hot, humid summers and mild, cool winters.

History
Shirahama Village was created on April 1, 1889 within Asai District, which became part of Awa District from April 1, 1897. It became a town on April 1, 1933.

On March 20, 2006, Shirahama, along with the towns of Chikura, Maruyama, Tomiura, Tomiyama and Wada, and the village of Miyoshi (all from Awa District), was merged to create the city of Minamibōsō.

Prior to the merger, Shirahama was known as Shirahama-machi in Japanese. Subsequently, it has become known as Shirahama-cho. Both "machi" and "cho" are written the same way in Japanese, but the different pronunciations convey the information that Shirahama is now a neighborhood within Minamibōsō rather than its own municipality.

Economy
The economy of Shirahama was largely based on commercial fishing, horticulture (primarily herbs and flowers), and summer tourism.

Local attractions
Nojimazaki Lighthouse

External links
Minamibōsō official website 

Dissolved municipalities of Chiba Prefecture
Minamibōsō